Leif Ekman (January 16, 1893 – October 1, 1967) was a Swedish track and field athlete who competed in the 1912 Summer Olympics. He was born in Göteborg and died in Råda, Västra Götaland County. In 1912 he finished seventh in the standing high jump event.

References

External links
profile

1893 births
1967 deaths
Swedish male high jumpers
Olympic athletes of Sweden
Athletes (track and field) at the 1912 Summer Olympics
Athletes from Gothenburg